Richard Robert Yonakor (October 3, 1958 – March 3, 2022) was an American basketball player. He played one season for the San Antonio Spurs of the National Basketball Association (NBA).

Yonakor, a 6'9" power forward/center from Euclid, Ohio, played collegiately at the University of North Carolina from 1976 to 1980 where he averaged 5.4 points and 3.7 rebounds per game for his career.

Despite his modest college statistics, Yonakor was drafted in the third round of the 1980 NBA Draft by the San Antonio Spurs.  After playing a season in Italy for Bartolini Brindisi, Yonakor made his NBA debut on March 8, 1982.  He appeared in 10 games, averaging 3.3 points and 2.3 rebounds per game in his only NBA season.  He also played in the Continental Basketball Association for the Rochester Zeniths and Montana Golden Nuggets.

Rich was the son of football player John Yonakor.

References

External links
Italian League profile

1958 births
2022 deaths
American expatriate basketball people in Italy
American men's basketball players
American people of Lithuanian descent
Basketball players from Ohio
Centers (basketball)
Montana Golden Nuggets players
North Carolina Tar Heels men's basketball players
People from Euclid, Ohio
Power forwards (basketball)
Rochester Zeniths players
San Antonio Spurs draft picks
San Antonio Spurs players
Sportspeople from Cuyahoga County, Ohio